This article lists events that occurred during 1947 in Estonia.

Incumbents

Events
 22 September – Bronze Soldier of Tallinn was unveiled.
 Collectivization and mass deportations took place (intensively until March 1949).

Births
10 January – Tiit Vähi, politician and businessman
4 December – Tõnu Kark, actor

Deaths

References

 
1940s in Estonia
Estonia
Estonia
Years of the 20th century in Estonia